Zurn Peak is a rocky peak (1,515 m) rising from the north edge of Toney Mountain, about 4 miles (6 km) northeast of Richmond Peak and just east of Roberts Cirque, in Marie Byrd Land. 

Mapped by United States Geological Survey (USGS) from surveys and U.S. Navy air photos, 1959–71, it was named by the Advisory Committee on Antarctic Names (US-ACAN) for Walter Zürn, Station Scientific Leader at South Pole Station, in 1972.

Mountains of Marie Byrd Land